Titus Burckhardt (24 October 1908 – 15 January 1984) was a Swiss writer and a leading member of the Perennialist or Traditionalist School. He was the author of numerous works on metaphysics, cosmology, anthropology, esoterism, alchemy, Sufism, symbolism and sacred art.

Life
Scion of a patrician family of Basel, Switzerland, Titus Burckhardt was the son of the sculptor Carl Burckhardt (1878–1923) and the grand-nephew of Jacob Burckhardt (1818–1897), an art historian and Renaissance specialist. His genealogical tree also includes John Lewis Burckhardt (1784–1817), the explorer who discovered the Nabatean city of Petra and the Egyptian temples of Abu Simbel. He was born in Florence, Italy, on October 24, 1908. The following year his family settled in Basel. He attended the same primary school as Frithjof Schuon, who became a lifelong friend. In 1920, his family left Basel for Ligornetto in the Swiss canton of Ticino, where his father died three years later.

Around 1927, Burckhardt began studying painting, sculpture and art history in Munich and Paris. Drawn to a traditional lifestyle that the West could not offer him, he took advantage of a break in his studies to visit Morocco (1928 or 1929), where he dedicated himself to drawing and painting. He was captivated by this sojourn, which marked the beginning of his spiritual quest. On his return, he discovered the works of the French metaphysician René Guénon, in whom "he found the key to the world that had entranced him".

In early 1933, Burckhardt returned to Morocco in search of a spiritual master. He converted to Islam and learned Arabic, enabling him to assimilate the Sufi classics in their original language. After some disappointments, his search led him to Fez, where he met Sheikh Alî al-Darqâwi, the grandson and spiritual successor of Muhammad al-Arabi al-Darqawi (†1823), the reformer of the Shadhili order. He was initiated by the Sheikh and received into the Tariqa Darqawiya. In a bid to meet his material needs, he acquired a flock of sheep and pastured them in the countryside of the Middle Atlas, but this did little to improve his precarious finances. Parallel with this, he took up an apprenticeship in zellij tile-making with a master craftsman from Fez, who urged him to memorize the Alfiyya of Ibn Malik, a didactic poem of a thousand verses which sets out all the rules of Arabic grammar; Burckhardt remained ever grateful to him for this.

In early 1935, he was visited in Fez by Frithjof Schuon, who was on his way back to Europe from the zawiya of the late Sheikh al-Alawi of Mostaganem. Schuon had received initiation from this Shadhili Sheikh in 1932. Burckhardt soon realized that his predestined guide was none other than his childhood friend. Burckhardt's complete integration into local life made him suspect in the eyes of the French authorities, who ordered him to leave the country. Thus in the spring of 1935, he returned to Basel. This marked the beginning of his correspondence with René Guénon, as well as his affiliation with Schuon's tariqa. Schuon, who was living in France at that time, charged Burckhardt with the spiritual direction of his disciples in Basel.

From 1936 to 1938 Burckhardt studied art history and Oriental languages at the University of Basel. 1937 marked the beginning of his collaboration with the Guénonian-inspired journal Études Traditionnelles, in which he published articles on traditional art (in particular Hindu, Christian and Muslim art), alchemy, traditional cosmology and astrology, folklore and various symbolisms. Many of these articles were later collected into two volumes. The journal also published his translations of Sufi treatises by Al-Ghazali, Ibn Arabi, Abd al-Karim al-Jili and al-Arabî al-Darqâwî. In the view of the Pakistani professor Muhammed Suheyl Omar, Burckhardt is one of the few authors who has not only expounded, but also assimilated, Ibn Arabi's metaphysics, a view confirmed by the Iranian Islamologist Seyyed Hossein Nasr, who has also said that Burckhardt's opus has contributed to the West's interest in Ibn Arabi since the second half of the 20th century.

Burckhardt married in 1939. Shortly thereafter, he was appointed artistic director and director of publications by the Swiss German publishing house Urs Graf, headquartered in Olten and Basel and specializing in the reproduction of medieval illuminated manuscripts. He remained there until his retirement in 1968. His working languages were German, French, Arabic, Latin, English and Italian. He and his wife settled in Bern, halfway between Olten and Lausanne, where Schuon resided. The quality of Urs Graf's publications brought it a worldwide reputation in its domain, and in October 1950, in a private audience, Burckhardt presented Pope Pius XII with a quadrichromic facsimile in three volumes of the celebrated Book of Kells (Evangeliorum quatuor codex Cenannensis), a gospel in the Celtic tradition dating from 800 A.D., published by his company.

In 1952, Burckhardt and his wife moved to Lausanne, where he founded the French-Swiss branch of Urs Graf and created the collection Stätten des Geistes ("Cities of the Spirit") for which he wrote and illustrated three volumes: Siena, City of the Virgin, Fez, City of Islam, and Chartres and the Birth of the Cathedral. These completed the collection, which already included volumes on Mount Athos, Mount Sinai, Celtic Ireland, Constantinople and Kyoto. In 1951, 1958 and 1960 other publishing houses brought out the original editions of Burckhardt's Introduction to Sufi Doctrine, Sacred Art in East and West and Alchemy, Science of the Cosmos, Science of the Soul.  Following Guénon, Coomaraswamy and Schuon, Burckhardt became identified as one of the great 20th century spokesmen of the philosophia perennis, "that 'uncreated wisdom' expressed in Platonism, the Vedanta, Sufism, Taoism and other authentic esoteric and sapiential teachings". According to the philosopher William Stoddart, Burckhardt — historian and philosopher of art, esoterist initiated in a Sufi path, metaphysician and artist — devoted his work as a writer to expounding "the different aspects of Wisdom and Tradition."

Morocco having recovered its independence in 1956, Burckhardt returned there regularly from 1960. In 1972, UNESCO, together with the Moroccan government, delegated him to Fez to take charge of the plan for restoration and rehabilitation of the medina and its religious patrimony, as well as its handcrafts. He remained there for five years, aware that the old city was probably the best preserved model of Islamic urbanism, and that once rehabilitated, Fez "could become a reference for the continuity of a traditional urban model, capable of evolution yet still conserving its intrinsic qualities." For the first two years Burkhardt, with drawing board and camera, singlehandedly made an inventory of the outstanding buildings, religious and secular, from the exterior and the interior, to evaluate their state of conservation. Over the three following years he led an interdisciplinary team tasked with establishing a master plan for the rehabilitation of the monuments and the urban fabric, including handcrafts "whose role is to create an ambiance that allows spiritual values to shine through." The "Master Plan of Urbanism for the City of Fez" was adopted and published by UNESCO in 1980.

During his mission to Fez, Burckhardt edited a general work on Islamic art,  Art of Islam: Language and Meaning, at the request of the organisers of the Festival of the Islamic World (London, 1976), of which he became one of the guiding forces. He was regularly invited as a specialist on traditional art and urbanism to give lectures, in both the Orient and the West, and to host or participate in seminars. The islamologist Jean-Louis Michon, who knew him well, described his qualities as a speaker thus:

For Prof. Seyyed Hossein Nasr, Burckhardt is the first Westerner "to seriously expound the inner meaning of Islamic art" and, according to Nasr, it is in large part due to his influence that European and American universities began offering courses on Islamic art and architecture. His capacities in this domain prompted Saudi Arabia to mandate him as adviser in the development of plans for a university campus in Mecca. So it was that in 1978 and 1979, together with the Egyptian Nobel laureate Hassan Fathy and Jean-Louis Michon, he oversaw the office of the American architects tasked with these plans, in order that the principles and spirit of traditional Muslim architecture be respected.

Burckhardt's empathy for Native American spirituality led him to the American West in 1979 to visit the medicine man Thomas Yellowtail; they had met in Paris in 1953 and again in Lausanne in 1954, and had maintained a deep friendship. His interest in the Native Americans was manifested in two published works: the German version of Black Elk Speaks (1955) and, eleven years later, Der wilde Westen ("The Wild West"), an illustrated compilation of quotes from famous Indian chiefs and 19th century settlers and cowboys.

In 1981, despite a debilitating neuropathy, Burckhardt went for the last time to Fez as guest of honour at the inauguration by the Director-General of UNESCO of the international campaign for the conservation of the medina.

He died in Lausanne on January 15, 1984.

Works

Books in German
Land am Rande der Zeit. Basel: Urs Graf Verlag, 1941.
Schweizer Volkskunst/Art Populaire Suisse. Basel: Urs Graf Verlag, 1941.
Tessin (Das Volkserbe der Schweiz, Band I). Basel: Urs Graf Verlag, 1943; enlarged edition, Basel: Urs Graf Verlag, 1959.
Vom Sufitum—Einführung in die Mystik des Islams. Munich: Otto Wilhelm Barth-Verlag, 1953.
Vom Wesen heiliger Kunst in den Weltreligionen. Zurich: Origo-Verlag, 1958.
Siena, Stadt der Jungfrau. Olten (Switzerland) and Freiburg-im-Breisgau (Germany): Urs Graf Verlag, 1958.
Alchemie, Sinn- und Weltbild. Olten and Freiburg-im-Breisgau: Walter-Verlag, 1960.
Fes, Stadt des Islam. Olten and Freiburg-im-Breisgau: Urs Graf Verlag, 1960.
Chartres und die Geburt der Kathedrale. Lausanne: Urs Graf Verlag, 1962.
Von wunderbaren Büchern. Olten and Freiburg: Urs Graf Verlag, 1963.
Die maurische Kultur in Spanien. Munich: Callwey Verlag, 1970.
Marokko, Westlicher Orient: ein Reiseführer. Olten and Freiburg: Walter-Verlag, 1972.
Spiegel der Weisheit: Texte zu Wissenschaft und Kunst. Munich: Diederichs, 1992.

As editor
Wallis by Charles Ferdinand Ramuz. Basel: Urs Graf Verlag, 1956.
Lachen und Weinen. Olten and Freiburg: Urs Graf Verlag, 1964.
Die Jagd. Olten and Freiburg: Urs Graf Verlag, 1964.
Der wilde Westen. Olten and Freiburg: Urs Graf Verlag, 1966.
Scipio und Hannibal: Kampf um das Mittelmeer by Friedrich Donauer. Cover design and six illustrations by Titus Burckhardt. Olten and Freiburg: Walter-Verlag, 1939.
Zeus und Eros: Briefe und Aufzeichnungen des Bildhauers Carl Burckhardt (1878–1923). Basel: Urs Graf Verlag, 1956.
Athos, der Berg des Schweigens by Philip Sherrard. Translation from the English by Titus Burckhardt of Athos, the Mountain of Silence. Lausanne and Freiburg: Urs Graf Verlag, 1959.

Books in French
Art populaire suisse / Schweizer Volkskunst. Basel, Switzerland: Urs Graf, 1941.
Tessin, Olten and Lausanne, Switzerland: Urs Graf, 1943, 1956.
Introduction aux doctrines ésotériques de l'islam, Lyon, France: Paul Derain, 1951 (original title: Du soufisme) ; Paris, Dervy, 1955, 1969, 2008.
Principes et méthodes de l'art sacré, Lyon, France: Paul Derain, 1958 ; rééditions : Paris, Dervy, 1976, 1995, 2011.
Alchimie: sa signification et son image du monde, Basel, Switzerland: Thoth & Fondation Ludwig Keimer, 1974 ; Milan, Archè, 1979.
Clé spirituelle de l'astrologie musulmane d'après Mohyiddîn Ibn Arabî, Paris: Éditions Traditionnelles 1950 ; Milan, Italy: Archè, 1974.
Symboles: recueil d'essais, Milan, Italy: Archè, 1980.
L'art de l'islam: langage et signification, Arles, France: Sindbad, 1985, 1999.
Science moderne et sagesse traditionnelle, Milan, Italy: Archè, 1986.
Aperçus sur la connaissance sacrée, Milan, Italy: Archè, 1987.
Miroir de l'intellect, Lausanne, Switzerland: L’Âge d’Homme, 1992.
Chartres et la naissance de la cathédrale, Milan, Italy & Dieulefit, France: Archè & La Nef de Salomon, 1995.
Fès, ville d'islam, Milan, Italy: Archè, 2007.
Sienne, ville de la Vierge, Lausanne, Switzerland: Les Sept Flèches, 2017.

Translations from the Arabic
with introduction and commentaries
Ibn Arabî, La sagesse des prophètes (Fusûs al-hikam), Paris: Albin Michel, 2008.
Abd al-Karîm al-Jîlî, De l'homme universel (Al-insân al-kâmil), Paris: Dervy, 1975.
Al-Arabî al-Darqâwî, Lettres d'un maître soufi, Milan, Italy: Archè, 1978.

Books in English
An Introduction to Sufi Doctrine (translated from the French by D. M. Matheson). Lahore, Pakistan: Ashraf, 1959; Wellingborough, England: Thorsons, 1976.
Art of Islam: Language and Meaning (translated from the French by Peter Hobson). London: Islamic Festival Trust, 1976. 
Siena, City of the Virgin (translated from the German by Margaret Brown). Oxford: University Press, 1960.
Famous Illuminated Manuscripts (partial translation of Von wunderbaren Büchern). Olten and Lausanne, Switzerland: Urs Graf Verlag, 1964.
Mirror of the Intellect: Essays on Traditional Science and Sacred Art (translated by William Stoddart). Cambridge, England: Quinta Essentia, 1987; Albany/NY: SUNY, 1987.
Fez, City of Islam (translated from the German by William Stoddart). Cambridge, England: Islamic Texts Society, 1992.
Chartres and the Birth of the Cathedral, (translated by William Stoddart). Ipswich, England: Golgonooza Press, 1995; Bloomington, Indiana: World Wisdom Books, 1995. 
The Universality of Sacred Art. Colombo: The Sri Lanka Institute of Traditional Studies, 1999.
Moorish Culture in Spain (new edition, translated from the German by Alisa Jaffa and William Stoddart). Louisville/KY: Fons Vitae, 1999.
Sacred Art in East and West (translated from the French by Lord Northbourne). Bedfont, Middlesex, England: Perennial Books, 1967; Louisville/KY: Fons Vitae, 2001; Bloomington/IN: World Wisdom Books, 2001.
Alchemy, Science of the Cosmos, Science of the Soul (translated from the German by William Stoddart). London: Stuart and Watkins, 1967; Baltimore/MD: Penguin Books, 1972; Longmead, Shaftesbury, Dorset: Element Books, 1986; Louisville/KY: Fons Vitae, 2001.
Mystical Astrology according to Ibn ‘Arabî (translated from the French by Bulent Rauf). Sherbourne, England: Beshara, 1977; Louisville/KY: Fons Vitae, 2002.

Anthologies of Burckhardt’s writings
Stoddart, William (ed.), The Essential Titus Burckhardt: Reflections on Sacred Art, Faiths, and Civilizations, Bloomington/IN: World Wisdom, 2003; foreword by Seyyed Hossein Nasr.
Fitzgerald, Michael O. (ed.), The Foundations of Christian Art, Bloomington/IN: World Wisdom, 2006; foreword by Keith Critchlow .
Fitzgerald,Michael O. (ed.), Foundations of Oriental Art & Symbolism, Bloomington/IN: World Wisdom, 2009; foreword by Brian Keeble .
Chouiref, Tayeb (ed.), Titus Burckhardt: Le soufisme entre Orient et Occident, volume 2 (études et analyses) (in French), Wattrelos, France: Tasnîm, 2020.

Bibliography 

 
 

 

 ♦ English version:

  ♦ English translation:

Notes

References

See also

External links
 
Books by Titus Burckhardt (Fons Vitae publishing)
Works of Titus Burckhardt in Hungarian
Titus Burckhardt resource page (at World Wisdom): excerpts, detailed biography, photos, extensive bibliography, additional links

1908 births
1984 deaths
Traditionalist School
Converts to Islam
Swiss Sufis
Sufi writers
Swiss philosophers
20th-century Swiss philosophers
Swiss scholars of Islam
Swiss orientalists
Swiss art historians
Titus
Swiss Muslims
Ibn Arabi scholars